Stephen C. Smith is an American professor currently employed as faculty at BYU-Idaho in the Sociology and Social Work Department. A social and religious theorist, he is an outspoken academic on a number of topics that traverse religion, economics, and sociology.

Education
Smith has a Ph.D. in Family Studies from Purdue University, an M.S. in Marriage and Family Therapy from Northern Illinois University, and a B.S. in Psychology from Brigham Young University.

Smith spent a large amount of time working with the ANASAZI Foundation, an outdoor behavioral health program, helping troubled youth prior to teaching sociology.

Publications
Smith has been involved with publications involving modern social issues as seen from contemporary perspectives. In 2001, he was jointly credited for publishing on the relationship between families and work especially in the 21st century. The work on the emerging sociological issues appeared in Minding the time in family experience: Emerging perspectives and issues (2001). His 2000 publication, The Meaning of Time for Reduced-load Workers and Their Families, on the relationship between working time and the meaning of time amongst families in the workforce was published by John Wiley & Sons. The research also explores the effects on gender roles, and shows that the social institutions of work and family are currently in flux.

In addition to John Wiley & Sons, Smith's research has been published by Purdue University.

Smith gave the keynote address at the BYU-Idaho faculty conference in Fall 2011, entitled the Liberal Arts and Magical Teaching.

See also
 Working time: Social Impact
 List of Notable Purdue University people: Professors
 Time management: Conceptual Effect on Labor
 Wilderness therapy - ANASAZI Foundation

References

External links
 Stephen's private website

1968 births
20th-century Mormon missionaries
Latter Day Saints from Indiana
Latter Day Saints from Idaho
American sociologists
Family therapists
Living people
American Marxists
Purdue University College of Health and Human Sciences alumni
Latter Day Saints from Illinois
American Mormon missionaries in Guatemala
Brigham Young University–Idaho faculty